A Season in Hakkari is a 1983 Turkish drama film directed by Erden Kıral. It was entered into the 33rd Berlin International Film Festival, where it won the Silver Bear - Special Jury Prize.

Plot
A disciplinary transfer leads a teacher into a remote village somewhere in the mountains. There are neither conventional roads nor electricity. Although the teacher will only stay for the winter, he puts a lot of effort into educating the local children while he can.

Cast
 Rana Cabbar
 Erol Demiröz
 Genco Erkal as teacher
 Berrin Koper
 Serif Sezer
 Erkan Yücel

References

External links

1983 films
1980s Turkish-language films
1983 drama films
Films directed by Erden Kıral
Films set in Turkey
Films based on Turkish novels
Turkish drama films
Films about educators
Silver Bear Grand Jury Prize winners